Axel Örnulf Tigerstedt (29 September 1900, Helsinki, Finland – 6 November 1962, Strängnäs, Sweden) was a Finnish-Swedish poet, novelist, translator, journalist and a supporter of Nazism before and during the Second World War.

Biography
Tigerstedt was born into the family of the famous scientist, geologist and dendrologist  and Maria Helena Florence von Schulz. He had a sister Maria and brothers Göran, Karl Gustav Ludwig, Axel Olof and Erik, a brilliant inventor. In his work he used the pseudonyms Axel Fredriksson, as a reference to Scandinavian patronymic naming system, and Eric Falander, his ancestors' former family name until 1691 when they were ennobled with the name Tigerstedt.

In 1918 Tigerstedt began publishing, and since the 1920s he worked with various mass media. For a long time he worked in the propaganda industry; in particular, he took part in the work of the Finnish censorship and propaganda organ State Information Service. In the early 1930s, Tigerstedt joined the Nazi Patriotic People's Party. He was deputy chairman of the Dante Alighieri Society and headed the Finnish PEN-club. In 1942, on the initiative of Goebbels, the European Association of Writers (German: , ESV) was founded. The group had about 40 prominent Finnish authors, including Mika Waltari, Tito Colliander, Jarl Hemmer and Maila Talvio. In the interwar and war years, Tigerstedt was the main ideologue of a group of young right-wing extremists called the Black Guard.

In the early autumn of 1944, Tigerstedt, who risked being prosecuted for his Nazi activities, was forced to emigrate to Sweden.

Works
The experiences of the Civil War in Finland and the strong conservatism of family traditions greatly influenced the formation of Tigerstedt as a writer, and subsequently prompted him to become a supporter of Nazism. With the classical contradiction between culture and nature at the heart of his worldview, the young writer adopted the teachings of such philosophers as Oswald Spengler and Lothrop Stoddard.

In 1918, Tigerstedt published his first collection of poems, designated, like the two subsequent books,  and Exercitia, as an apprenticeship to and imitation of Verner von Heidenstam. In the thirties, Tigerstedt was considered one of the greatest modernists in Sweden and Finland. Tigerstedt has been described as "the lyrical standard-bearer of fascism and Nazism in Swedish-speaking countries".

In both poetry and prose Tigerstedt had an inherent admiration for power. The poem "The Prince" from this latest collection contains the following words:

Where there is right, there is truth.
Bent necks greet the banners of the victors,
And the goddess makes the bed in the tent of the winner.

During World War II, the writer's deeply rooted anti-communism was clearly manifested. In 1942 he published the book The Fight Against Soviet Spies in Finland 1919–1939. In the extremely pro-German  (1944), in a threatening tone, discussions are conducted about the future of Europe, warnings about the consequences of possible victory of the Soviet Union in World War II are set forth.

Books

 .  Söderström & Co. 1918
 .  Söderström 1923
 Exercitia.  Söderström 1924
 .  Söderström 1928
 .  Söderström 1928
 . Söderström 1930
 . Söderström 1931
 . Söderström 1933
 .  Söderström 1934
 . Söderström 1935
 , edited by Örnulf Tigerstedt. Itsenäisyyden liitto 1940
 . Söderström 1940
 . Självständighetsförb. Stockholm 1940
 . Söderström part one:  1940, part two:  1952
 .  Otava part one 1940, part two 1952
 .  Fahlcrantz & Gumaelius, Stockholm 1942
 .  Otava 1943
 .  1944
 . Söderström 1945
 .  Söderström 1947
 .  Söderström 1948
 . Fahlcrantz & Gumælius, Stockholm 1949
 .  Söderström 1950
 .  Söderström 1951
 .  Söderström 1953
 .  1957
 . Tomas förlag, Strängnäs 1964

References

Finnish writers in Swedish
Finnish poets
1900 births
1962 deaths
Finnish Nazis
Nazi propagandists
Fascist writers
Finnish poets in Swedish
Swedish-speaking Finns
Writers from Helsinki
Nazis from outside Germany